Emily White may refer to:
Emily White (gardener) (1839–1936), New Zealand gardener and writer
Emily White (businessperson) (living), American technology executive and president of Anthos Capital
Emily Jane White, American singer and songwriter